Viehkogel is a  high mountain of Bavaria, Germany. It is located with the Steinernes Meer, a sub-range of the Berchtesgadener Alps.

Mountains of the Alps
Mountains of Bavaria
Berchtesgaden Alps